Parascaptia is a genus of moths in the subfamily Arctiinae.

Species
 Parascaptia biplagata Bethune-Baker, 1908
 Parascaptia dochmoschema (Turner, 1940)
 Parascaptia insignifica Rothschild, 1916
 Parascaptia variegata Rothschild, 1912

References

Natural History Museum Lepidoptera generic names catalog

Lithosiini
Moth genera